Peale Inlet is an ice-filled inlet about 16 nautical miles (30 km) long, lying immediately west of Noville Peninsula and indenting the north side of Thurston Island. It was delineated from aerial photographs taken by U.S. Navy Operation HIGHJUMP in December 1946, and named by the Advisory Committee on Antarctic Names for Titian Ramsay Peale, artist-naturalist who served on the sloop-of-war Peacock of the United States Exploring Expedition under Wilkes, 1838–42. The Peacock, accompanied by the tender Flying Fish, sailed along the edge of the pack ice to the north of Thurston Island for several days in March 1839.

Maps 
 Thurston Island – Jones Mountains. 1:500000 Antarctica Sketch Map. US Geological Survey, 1967.
 Antarctic Digital Database (ADD). Scale 1:250000 topographic map of Antarctica. Scientific Committee on Antarctic Research (SCAR). Since 1993, regularly upgraded and updated.

Further reading 
 United States. Defense Mapping Agency. Hydrographic Center, Sailing Directions for Antarctica: Includes Islands South of Latitude 60°, P 210

External links 

 Peale Inlet on USGS website
 Peale Inlet on AADC website
 Peale Inlet on SCAR website
 Peale Inlet on marineregions.org

References 

Inlets of Ellsworth Land